The fourth inauguration of Franklin D. Roosevelt as president of the United States was held on Saturday, January 20, 1945. This was the 40th inauguration and marked the commencement of the fourth and final term of Franklin D. Roosevelt as president and the only term of Harry S. Truman as vice president. This is the only time a president was inaugurated for a fourth term; after the Twenty-second Amendment to the United States Constitution was ratified in 1951, no person can be elected president more than twice. Roosevelt died  days into this term, and Truman succeeded to the presidency.

Due to austerity measures in effect during World War II, the inauguration was held on the South Portico of the White House, rather than the Capitol. The parade and other festivities were canceled as well. The oath was administered by Chief Justice Harlan F. Stone and the subsequent address was one of the shortest on record. This was also the most recent inauguration in which an outgoing vice president swore in his successor, which had previously been the practice. Roosevelt's presidency was, and remains, the longest in American history.

See also
Presidency of Franklin D. Roosevelt
First inauguration of Franklin D. Roosevelt
Second inauguration of Franklin D. Roosevelt
Third inauguration of Franklin D. Roosevelt
1944 United States presidential election

References

External links
Newsreel footage of Roosevelt's 1945 inauguration from C-SPAN (via YouTube)
Text of Roosevelt's Fourth Inaugural Address
Audio of Roosevelt's Fourth Inaugural Address (via YouTube)

Roosevelt, Franklin 1945
Roosevelt inaug
Roosevelt inaug
Inauguration 1945
White House
January 1945 events in the United States